Greg Scott (born 21 June 1991) is a professional rugby league footballer who most recently played for the Swinton Lions in the Kingstone Press Championship. He plays on the wing.

Scott came through the Widnes Vikings Academy.

Scott has previously played for Swinton, Widnes and the Dewsbury Rams.

References

Living people
1991 births
Swinton Lions players
Widnes Vikings players
Dewsbury Rams players
Rugby league wingers